Hương Canh is town and the district capital of Bình Xuyên District, Vĩnh Phúc Province, in the Red River Delta region of northern Vietnam.

References

Populated places in Vĩnh Phúc province
District capitals in Vietnam
Townships in Vietnam